Jelenin may refer to the following places in Poland:
Jelenin, Lower Silesian Voivodeship (south-west Poland)
Jelenin, Lubusz Voivodeship (west Poland)
Jelenin, West Pomeranian Voivodeship (north-west Poland)